In operating systems, a task manager is a system monitor program used to provide information about the processes and applications running on a computer, as well as the general status of the computer. Some implementations can also be used to terminate processes and applications, as well as change the processes' scheduling priority.  In some environments, users can access a task manager with the Control-Alt-Delete keyboard shortcut.

Task managers can display running services (processes) as well as those that were stopped. They can display information about the services, including their process identifier and group identifier.

Common task managers
 Activity Monitor, included in macOS
 Conky, for the X Window System
 htop, for the Unix shell
 KDE System Guard, included in KDE
 nmon, for Linux and AIX
 ps, for the Unix shell
 Task Manager, included in Windows
 tasklist, for DOS
 top, for the Unix shell

References 

Task managers